SuperEgo is a short-lived instrumental project conceived and produced by Stevie Wonder in 1979.

Concept
Stevie, who had been growing his interest in electronic music, tried to create an album with constant BPMs and heavily use of overdubbing techniques.  Often counting with The Meters as his backing band, Stevie recorded two albums (Vol. 1 and Vol. 2) at his home studio in Detroit through a nine-month period. Both albums were finished but never released and then abandoned due to "lack of commercial power", as he says.

Members
Stevie Wonder - piano, clavinet, drum machine, synthesizers
Art Neville - hammond organ, synthesizers
Ziggy Modeliste - drums
Leo Nocentelli - guitar
George Porter Jr. - bass guitar

References 

Stevie Wonder
American instrumental musical groups
Musical groups from Detroit